Cadbury is a village in Devon, England. Cadbury Castle is nearby.

The 15th-century Church of St Michael and All Angels features a Norman font. The church was restored in 1857 by William White, with Frederick Coleridge serving as its vicar from 1855 to 1906.

References

External links

Villages in Mid Devon District